The Abandonment of Animals Act 1960 (8 & 9 Eliz. II c. 43) was an Act of Parliament in the United Kingdom. It received Royal Assent on 2 June 1960.

The Act made it a criminal offense to abandon an animal, or permit it to be abandoned, "in circumstances likely to cause the animal any unnecessary suffering". The offense was treated as "cruelty" within the terms of the Protection of Animals Act 1911 section 1 subsection 1, which as amended currently provides for a fine or up to six months imprisonment on conviction.

The Act extends to England and Wales, and Scotland, but not to Northern Ireland.

The Act was repealed in England and Wales by the Animal Welfare Act 2006, and in Scotland by the Animal Health and Welfare (Scotland) Act 2006.

See also 
 Animal welfare in the United Kingdom

References

External links

United Kingdom Acts of Parliament 1960
Repealed United Kingdom Acts of Parliament
Animal welfare and rights legislation in the United Kingdom